The Norwegian Rugby Federation - Rugby League is the governing body for the sport of rugby league football in Norway.

See also

 Rugby league in Norway
 Norway national rugby league team

References

External links

Rugby league governing bodies in Europe
Rugby league in Norway
Rugby League
Sports organizations established in 2009